Jabez Turner (1828–1899) was a mayor of Sacramento, California.

Biography
Originally apprenticed as a carpenter, he left England for America with his wife Elizabeth in 1852 and worked in rail-road shops in Syracuse, Hamilton, Grand Rapids, Torch Lake and Sturgeon Bay, before migrating to California via the Panama Canal in 1864, where he was employed in the wood-working section of the San Francisco and Alameda Railroad (later part of the Central Pacific Railroad Company) until 1871, when he was transferred to the shops in Sacramento.

He was elected mayor of that city in March 1878, on what was known as the State Workingmen's ticket, and served for three years; his administration was a progressive but non-partisan one, with many reforms and improvements being put in operation under his direction.  He later served as a director of the Sacramento Free Library and the Sacramento Building & Loan Association.

Turner lost his first two wives to illness, and was survived by his third, Nancy Phelps Turner. He had seven children. Turner is interred in the Sacramento Historic City Cemetery.

Quotes
"To my view life with all its concomitants is bounded by earthly existence, and 'all beyond is barred to human ken.'"

References
Reed, G. Walter, History of Sacramento County, California With Biographical Sketches, Pages 517-518.  Historic Record Company, Los Angeles, CA. 1923.
"A Volume of Memoirs And Genealogy of Representative Citizens of Northern California" Standard Genealogical Publishing Co. Chicago. 1901. Pages 174–176.

1828 births
1899 deaths
Mayors of Sacramento, California
English expatriates in the United States
19th-century American politicians